Artaballabha Mohanty, was a notable writer and literary critique.

Career 
He was born in Cuttack. He received Master of Arts in Odia literature and M.A. in Sanskrit. Then he became a professor at Ravenshaw University, Cuttack, Odisha. He was the founder of Prachi Samiti (1925-1934), a literary institution that played a key role in reshaping Odia literature..He was a good person in their life time.

Mohanty has also published the only available print record of Madala Panji.

Awards and medals 
 Padma Shri, (1960) by the Government of India

References

1887 births
1969 deaths
Writers from Odisha
Odia-language writers
People from Cuttack
Recipients of the Padma Shri in literature & education
Mohanty
Indian literary critics
20th-century Indian educational theorists
Scholars from Odisha